Mayorovsky is a rural locality (a khutor) and the administrative center of Mayorovskoye Rural Settlement, Kotelnikovsky District, Volgograd Oblast, Russia. The population was 559 as of 2010. There are 22 streets.

Geography 
Mayorovsky is located in steppe, 15 km southeast of Kotelnikovo (the district's administrative centre) by road. Kotelnikovo is the nearest rural locality.

References 

Rural localities in Kotelnikovsky District